"Mr. Tung Twista" is the first single released by Twista, who was then known as Tung Twista, from his debut album, Runnin' Off at da Mouth. It was released on November 22, 1991, shortly before Twista became the Guinness Book of World Records holder as the fastest emcee in 1992. A promotional music video was released and got played on shows such as Yo! MTV Raps and Rap City, but the single itself failed to make it to the Billboard charts.

Single track listing
"Mr. Tung Twista" (Vocal)- 4:07
"Mr. Tung Twista" (Accapella)- 1:00
"Mr. Tung Twista" (Instrumental)- 4:07
"Hokus Pokus"- 3:59

References

1991 singles
Twista songs
Songs written by Twista